Nedum Cheralathan was a Chera ruler of the early historic south India (c. 1st - 4th century CE), contemporary to the Chola ruler Perunarkilli. He won the title 'Imayavaramban' which means 'whose limit extends upto Himalayas' as he fought various kings around Kerala and reached upto Himalayas. He is the second known Chera ruler from the early Sangham literature, and is praised in the Second Ten of Pathitruppaththu (composed by poet Kannanar). He patronized Jainism and Buddhism.

Nedum Cheralathan succeeded his father (Uthiyan Cheralathan) and ruled the territory for 58 years (as a crown prince first and then as an absolute ruler). He was a successful ruler with several victories over neighbouring rulers such as the Kadambas. He is believed to have won over "seven crowned kings" and thus obtained the status of "adhiraja". He defeated an enemy on the Malabar Coast and captured several Yavana traders, later releasing them for ransom. Nedum Cheralathan fought a battle against a Chola ruler, an encounter in which both the principal adversaries lost their lives.

References

Citations
 

2nd-century Indian monarchs
People of the Chera kingdom
Chera kings